The term en homme  is an anglicized adaptation of a French phrase. It is used in the transgender and crossdressing community to describe the act of wearing masculine clothing or expressing a stereotypically masculine personality. The term is derived from the modern colloquial French phrase en tant qu'homme meaning "as a man" and the anglicized adaptation en homme  literally translates as "in man". Most crossdressers also use a homme (male) name whilst en homme.

See also 

 En femme
 List of transgender-related topics
 List of transgender-rights organizations
 Tomboy

Cross-dressing
Trans men
LGBT slang
French words and phrases